Adam Lorenc (born October 30, 1998) is a Polish volleyball player.
Since the 2020/2021 season, he has played for Cuprum Lubin.

References

External links
 Tauron1Liga profile
 Volleybox profile
 BraveVolley profile

1998 births
People from Żary
Living people
Polish men's volleyball players